Carré d'Aurillac is a brand of blue cheese owned by the Toulouse based co-operatively owned cheese company Les Fromageries Occitanes. It is an industrially produced blue cheese also sometimes known as Bleu d'Aurillac.   The cheese itself is produced at Bedoussac, which is administratively part of the rural commune of  Saint-Mamet-la-Salvetat in the French department of Cantal.

The cheese is square (carré) in shape and made from pasteurized cow's milk.

References

French cheeses
Occitan cheeses
Cow's-milk cheeses
Blue cheeses